The 2019 Ladies' National Football League, known for sponsorship reasons as the Lidl Ladies' National Football League, is a ladies' Gaelic football competition taking place in early 2019.

Cork were the champions, defeating Galway in the final to win a record 12th league title.

Format

League structure
The 2019 Ladies' National Football League consists of four divisions of eight teams. Each team plays every other team in its division once. 3 points are awarded for a win and 1 for a draw.

If two teams are level on points, the tie-break is:
 winners of the head-to-head game are ranked ahead
 if the head-to-head match was a draw, then whichever team scored more points in the game is ranked ahead (e.g. 1-15 beats 2-12)
 if the head-to-head match was an exact draw, ranking is determined by the points difference (i.e. total scored minus total conceded in all games)
 if the points difference is equal, ranking is determined by the total scored

If three or more teams are level on league points, rankings are determined solely by points difference.

Finals, promotions and relegations
The top four teams in Division 1 contest the Ladies' National Football League semi-finals (first plays fourth and second plays third).

The top four teams in divisions 2, 3 and 4 contest the semi-finals of their respective divisions. The division champions are promoted.

The last-placed teams in divisions 1, 2 and 3 are relegated.

Division 1

Table

Semi-finals

Final

Division 2

Table

Kerry are ranked ahead of Clare because, although the head-to-head game was a draw, Kerry scored more points (1-17 to 4-8).

Semi-finals

Final

Division 3

Table

Semi-finals

Final

Division 4

Table

Semi-finals

Final

References

 League
Ladies' National Football League seasons